"Moon River" is a 1961 song by Johnny Mercer and Henry Mancini.

Moon River may also refer to:

Rivers
 Moon River (Ontario), a river in west central Ontario, Canada
 Moon River, near Savannah, Georgia, in the United States; see Herb River
 Moon River, better known as the Mun River, a tributary of the Mekong in Thailand
 Moon River, better known as the Yue River, a river in Shaanxi, China

Entertainment
 Moon River (radio program), a long-running radio program
 Moon River (TV series) (also called The Return of Iljimae), a South Korean television series
 Moon River: The Very Best of Andy Williams, a 2009 album by Andy Williams
 Moon River and Other Great Movie Themes, a 1962 album by Andy Williams
 Moon River (TV series), a Taiwanese television series

Other uses
 Moon River (gin cocktail), a cocktail prepared with gin
 Moon River, Ontario, Canada
 Moon River Brewing Company, Savannah, Georgia
 , a Singaporean coaster

See also 
 Halfmoon River, in the U.S. state of Georgia
 Loon River
 Moon (disambiguation)